In the United States there is no federal law regulating the practice of tattooing. However, all 50 states and the District of Columbia have statutory laws requiring a person receiving a tattoo be at least 18 years old. This is partially based on the legal principle that a minor cannot enter into a legal contract or otherwise render informed consent for a procedure. Most states permit a person under the age of 18 to receive a tattoo with permission of a parent or guardian, but some states prohibit tattooing under a certain age regardless of permission, with the exception of medical necessity (such as markings placed for radiation therapy).

In all jurisdictions, individual tattooers may also choose to place additional restrictions based on their own moral feelings, such as refusing any clients under a specific age even with parental consent, or limiting the type and/or location of where they are willing to tattoo (such as refusing any work around certain  parts of the body). They may additionally refuse to perform specific artwork, including artwork they consider offensive, or refuse to work on a client they suspect may be intoxicated.  Tattooers sometimes claim their personal business restrictions are a matter of law, even when it is not true, so as to avoid arguments with clients.

References

Tattooing and law
Law of the United States
Minimum ages